Danailov (masculine)  or Danailova (feminine) is a Bulgarian surname. Notable people with the surname include:

 Mario Danailov (born 1988), Bulgarian footballer
 Silvio Danailov (born 1961), Bulgarian chess player and manager
 Stefan Danailov (1942–2019), Bulgarian actor and politician
 Dobromira Danailova (born 1995), Bulgarian recurve archer

Bulgarian-language surnames